The Rolling Stones' 1966 European Tour was a concert tour by the band. The tour commenced on March 26 and concluded on April 5, 1966. Support acts for the tour included Wayne Fontana & the Mindbenders, Ian Witcomb, Antoine et les Problèmes (les Charlots), The Newbeats, Les Hou-Lops and Ronnie Bird.

The Rolling Stones
Mick Jagger - lead vocals, harmonica, percussion
Keith Richards - guitar, backing vocals
Brian Jones - guitar, harmonica, backing vocals, percussion
Bill Wyman - bass guitar, backing vocals
Charlie Watts - drums

Tour dates

Set list
The Last Time 
Mercy Mercy (Don Covay cover) 
She Said Yeah (Larry Williams cover) 
Play With Fire 
Not Fade Away (The Crickets cover) 
The Spider and the Fly 
Time Is on My Side (Kai Winding & His Orchestra cover) 
19th Nervous Breakdown 
Hang On Sloopy (The McCoys cover)
Get Off of My Cloud 
Around and Around (Chuck Berry cover) 
I'm All Right (Bo Diddley cover) 
(I Can't Get No) Satisfaction

References
 Carr, Roy.  The Rolling Stones: An Illustrated Record.  Harmony Books, 1976.  

The Rolling Stones concert tours
1966 concert tours
1966 in Europe
March 1966 events in Europe
April 1966 events in Europe